Jaime Suárez Juesas (born 31 December 1996), commonly known as Jimmy, is a Spanish footballer who plays for Real Oviedo as a midfielder.

Club career
Born in Oviedo, Asturias, Jimmy represented Colegio Los Robles, Fútbol Centro Asturiano Oviedo, Astur CF and Real Oviedo as a youth. In 2015, after finishing his formation, he was loaned back to his former side Astur in Tercera División, for one year.

After being a regular starter, Jimmy returned to his parent club in July 2016 and was assigned to the B-team also in the fourth division. He made his first team debut on 31 March 2019, starting in a 1–1 Segunda División home draw against Deportivo de La Coruña.

On 1 May 2019, Jimmy extended his contract until 2022, being definitely promoted to the main squad for the following campaign.

References

External links

1996 births
Living people
Footballers from Oviedo
Spanish footballers
Association football midfielders
Segunda División players
Segunda División B players
Tercera División players
Real Oviedo Vetusta players
Real Oviedo players